Robert Kerr may refer to:

Sportsmen
 Robert Kerr (Australian footballer) (born 1967), former Australian rules footballer
 Robert Kerr (athlete) (1882–1963), Canadian athlete & Olympic medalist
 Robbie Kerr (racing driver) (born 1979), English racing driver
 Robbie Kerr (Australian cricketer) (born 1961)
 Robbie Kerr (New Zealand cricketer) (born 1966)
 Bob Kerr (cricket official) (1939–2007), former head of the Irish Cricket Union
 Bob Kerr (Australian footballer) (1875–1943), Australian rules footballer

Politicians and noblemen
 Robert S. Kerr (1896–1963), governor of, and senator from, Oklahoma
 Robert S. Kerr III (born 1950), Lieutenant Governor of Oklahoma
 Robert John Kerr (1943–1997), Northern Irish loyalist
 Robert Kerr, 1st Marquess of Lothian (1636–1703), Scottish nobleman
 Robert Kerr, 2nd Earl of Lothian (died 1624), Scottish nobleman
 Lord Robert Kerr (died 1746), Scottish nobleman
 Robert Kerr, 1st Earl of Ancram (c. 1578–1654), Scottish nobleman, politician and writer
 Robert Kerr (Canadian politician) (1929-2010), Canadian politician and businessman

Others
 Robert Kerr (architect) (1823–1904), British architect and writer
 Robert Kerr (doctor), Canadian doctor, Indian Department officer and judge, see William Johnson Kerr
 Robert Kerr (writer) (1757–1813), Scottish writer 
 Robert P. Kerr (1892–1960), film director
 Robert S. Kerr (bishop) (1917–1988), bishop of the Episcopal Diocese of Vermont
 Robert Kerr (missionary) (died 1918), British physician, missionary, judge, and author
 Robert Malcolm Kerr (1821–1902), British judge
 Bob Kerr (author and artist) (born 1951), New Zealand author, illustrator and artist
 Bobby Kerr (businessman) (born 1960), Irish businessman, CEO Insomnia Coffee
 Bob Kerr (musician) (born 1940), English comic musician; member of the Bonzo Dog Doo-Dah Band, The New Vaudeville Band and Bob Kerr's Whoopie Band
 Bob Kerr (radio presenter) (died 2003), CBC radio classical music presenter, see List of Canadian Broadcasting Corporation personalities

See also
 Robert Ker (disambiguation)
 Bobby Kerr (disambiguation)
 Robert Carr (disambiguation)